Momulu Massaquoi (1869–1938) was a Liberian politician, diplomat, and monarch of the Vai people of Sierra Leone and Liberia. He served as Liberia's consul general to Germany 1922–1930, and appears to be the first indigenous African diplomat to modern Europe.

Early life
Massaquoi was born on 6 December 1869 to King Lahai of the Gallinas Kingdom and his wife, Queen Fatama Bendu Sandemani of N’Jabacca. He attended a mission school in Cape Mount, before traveling to the United States to attend Central Tennessee College.

Massaquoi was required by his mother to begin to study at an early age. His parents were both Muslims, and in the hopes that their son might learn to read the Koran, they placed him as a student of a Muslim cleric when he was eight years old. Two years later, he came under Christian influence at a mission school of the Protestant Episcopal Church, where he was sent to learn the English language. After several years’ residence at the mission, he was baptized and confirmed. In 1888 he began attending Central Tennessee College in Nashville, Tennessee. His mother died while he was in college,  and her death made him the rightful ruler of N’Jabacca. He felt it to be his duty to return to his people, but again visited the United States to represent Africa at the Parliament of Religious and the African Ethnological Congress in connection with the World's Columbian Exposition. He opened, in May, 1900, an industrial school at Ghendimah, the capital of Gallinas. Here, the pupils were instructed in English, Vei, and Arabic, and in the industrial arts. He was endeavoring, in his own words, “to develop an African civilization independent of any, yet, like others, on a solid Christian principle.”

Death
He died on June 15, 1938.

Notable descendants
Nathaniel Varney Massaquoi, son, Liberian politician
Hans Massaquoi, grandson, German journalist
Fatima Massaquoi, daughter, Liberian academic
Fasia Jansen, illegitimate daughter, German singer-songwriter and political activist

References

Bibliography

Further reading

External links
Synopsis: The First African Diplomat - summary of Raymond J. Smyke's biographical manuscript covering the life of Momolu Massaquoi

1869 births
1938 deaths
Converts to Christianity
Liberian Episcopalians
Liberian former Muslims
Liberian politicians
Massaquoi family
People from Grand Cape Mount County
Walden University (Tennessee) alumni
20th-century Liberian diplomats